Máximo Arrates Boza (also known as Maestro Chicito) (Santiago de Cuba, November 6, 1859 – August 9, 1936) was a Panamanian composer.  He also played viola in the national symphony orchestra, and was a professor at the Conservatorio de Música y Declamación de Panamá.

Panamanian composers
Panamanian male musicians
Male composers
1859 births
1936 deaths
19th-century composers
19th-century male musicians
19th-century musicians
20th-century composers
20th-century male musicians